At the Mountains of Madness and Other Novels is a collection of stories by American author H. P. Lovecraft. It was originally published in 1964  by Arkham House in an edition of 3,552 copies. The true first edition has no head- or tailbands and features a green dustjacket (as depicted right). (Later states of the dustjacket are red and orange.)

The collection was revised in 1986 by S. T. Joshi, replacing the introduction by August Derleth for one by Joshi and another by James Turner. It was published in an edition of 3,990 copies and designated a "corrected 5th printing".

Contents

At the Mountains of Madness and Other Novels contains the following tales:

 H. P. Lovecraft's Novels by August Derleth
 At the Mountains of Madness
 The Case of Charles Dexter Ward
 "The Shunned House"
 "The Dreams in the Witch-House"
 "The Statement of Randolph Carter"
 "The Dream-Quest of Unknown Kadath"
 "The Silver Key"
 "Through the Gates of the Silver Key"

Reprints

Arkham House
2nd printing, 1968 - 2,987 copies.
3rd printing, 1971 - 3,082 copies.
4th printing, 1975 - 4,005 copies.
corrected 5th printing, 1986 - 3,990 copies.
corrected 6th printing, 1987 - 4,077 copies.
corrected 7th printing, 1991 - 4,461 copies.
corrected 8th printing, 1997 - 3,032 copies.
corrected 9th printing, 2001 - 2,500 copies.

Others
London: Victor Gollancz, 1966 (of the original edition).

References

1964 short story collections
Short story collections by H. P. Lovecraft
Cthulhu Mythos anthologies